csUnit is a unit testing framework for the .NET Framework. It is designed to work with any .NET compliant language. It has specifically been tested with C#, Visual Basic .NET, Managed C++, and J#. csUnit is open-source and comes with a flexible license that allows cost-free inclusion in commercial closed-source products as well.

csUnit follows the concepts of other unit testing frameworks in the xUnit family and has had several releases since 2002. The tool offers a native GUI application, a command line, and addins for Visual Studio 2005 and Visual Studio 2008.

Starting with version 2.4 it also supports execution of NUnit tests without recompiling. This feature works for NUnit 2.4.7 (.NET 2.0 version).

csUnit supports .NET 3.5 and earlier versions, but does not support .NET 4.

Special features
Along with the standard features, csUnit offers abilities that are uncommon in other unit testing frameworks for .NET:
 Categories to group included, excluded tests
 ExpectedException working with concrete instances rather than type only
 Out of the box addins for Visual Studio 2005 and 2008
 A tab for simple performance base lining
 A very rich set of assertions, continuously expanded
 Rich set of attributes for implementing tests
 Parameterized testing, data-driven testing
 Search abilities, saving time when test suites have thousands of tests

See also
 Test automation
 List of unit testing frameworks

References

Further reading

External links
 
 

Extreme programming
Free software programmed in C Sharp
Unit testing frameworks